Get Free may refer to:
 "Get Free" (The Vines song), 2002
 "Get Free" (Major Lazer song), 2013
 "Get Free" (Lana Del Rey song), 2017
 "Get Free", a 2011 song by Scream from Complete Control Recording Sessions

See also 

 "Freedom Dance (Get Free!)", a 1991 song by Vanessa Williams from The Comfort Zone